Dirk Johannes Lehmann (born 16 August 1971) is a German former professional footballer who manager an Alemannia Aachen youth team.

Career
Lehmann was born in Aachen. He made his senior debut with 1. FC Köln, and after a brief spell with Lierse S.K., joined another Belgian side in R.W.D. Molenbeek.

He played for Molenbeek in the 1996–97 Belgian First Division and made 26 League appearances plus a further two in the UEFA Cup, before returning to play in Germany with FC Energie Cottbus. He then transferred to Fulham for the 1998–99 season, making 26 League appearances for the club. 
At Fulham, Lehmann quickly earn a nickname 'The Porn Star' by the Fulham faithful, due to his "neat moustache and tinted hair his nickname was irresistible and typical of our supporters' sense of humour". After leaving Fulham, he moved to Scottish side Hibernian.

Lehmann scored twice on his debut for Hibernian in a 2–2 draw with Motherwell. He left Hibs under freedom of contract in 2001 and signed for Brighton & Hove Albion. Lehmann drew some press attention for playing with earrings on, which he would cover with white sticking plasters during matches. While he was playing for Brighton, Lehmann was banned by The Football Association from wearing them. He scored once during his spell at Brighton, in a Football League Trophy game against Swansea City.

Lehmann returned to Scotland six months later with Motherwell, where he was one of the players who negotiated a new contract after the club was placed into administration. He played for Motherwell for a further season alongside the young James McFadden in attack.

Following his release from Motherwell signed a lucrative contract with Yokohama FC.

Coaching career
Lehmann took over as coach of lower league side Sportfreunde Düren.

References

External links 

Dirk Lehmann at  www.ihibs.co.uk

Living people
1971 births
Sportspeople from Aachen
Association football forwards
German footballers
Alemannia Aachen players
1. FC Köln players
1. FC Köln II players
FC Energie Cottbus players
R.W.D. Molenbeek players
Lierse S.K. players
Fulham F.C. players
Hibernian F.C. players
Brighton & Hove Albion F.C. players
Motherwell F.C. players
Yokohama FC players
SSV Jahn Regensburg players
J2 League players
Scottish Premier League players
English Football League players
Belgian Pro League players
Bundesliga players
2. Bundesliga players
German expatriate footballers
German expatriate sportspeople in England
Expatriate footballers in England
German expatriate sportspeople in Scotland
Expatriate footballers in Scotland
German expatriate sportspeople in Belgium
Expatriate footballers in Belgium
German expatriate sportspeople in Japan
Expatriate footballers in Japan
Footballers from North Rhine-Westphalia